I Dream of Murder is a television film directed by Neill Fearnley and starring Jolene Blalock and Martin Cummins.

Cast
 Jolene Blalock as Joanna
 Martin Cummins as Clay
 Carrie Colak as Leslie
 Jeff McGrail		
 Judith Buchan as Dorothea
 Tom Carey as Lawyer
 Neill Fearnley as Captain (as Neil Fearnley)
 Khari Jones as Police Officer
 Elizabeth Lavender as Young Joanna
 Greg Lawson as Detective Thorn
 Giovanni Mocibob as Jesse
 Kevin Rothery as Alan
 Joe Norman Shaw as Marshall

External links

Official Website 

American television films
Films directed by Neill Fearnley
2006 television films
2006 films
2000s English-language films